Morgen Freiheit (English: Morning Freedom) was a New York City-based daily Yiddish language newspaper affiliated with the Communist Party, USA, founded by Moissaye Olgin in 1922. After the end of World War II the paper's pro-Israel views brought it into disfavor with the Communist Party and its editor Paul Novick was expelled from the organization. The paper closed in 1988.

Institutional history

Establishment
The Freiheit was established in 1922 as a self-described "Communistic fighting newspaper" in the Yiddish language. The paper's chief goals included the promotion of the Jewish labor movement, the defense of the Soviet Union, the advancement of proletarian culture, and the defeat of racism in America.

Development

By 1925, the press run of the Freiheit grew to 22,000 copies per issue, making it the largest of nine daily newspapers in the United States affiliated with the American Communist Party.

The Morning Freiheit/Morgen Freiheit in its time was one of the most prominent Yiddish newspapers published in the United States, and the showcase of left socialist artists and writers both Jewish and non-Jewish, Zionist and internationalist. Among the writers to appear in its pages was Michael Gold, the author of the novel Jews Without Money. The newspaper made political contributions related to the formation of the International Fur and Leather Workers Union, as well as many of the needle trades unions in the United States, including the Amalgamated Clothing Workers union, and perhaps the Congress of Industrial Organizations (which later merged with the AFL as the AFL-CIO).

Following Moissaye Olgin's sudden death in November 1939, the Freiheit was headed by Paul Novick (1891-1989), a journalist born in Brest-Litovsk who had first come to America in 1913. Novick had been associated with the publication from its foundation in 1922 and was active in the ICOR, the American Committee of Jewish Writers, Artists and Scientists, and other Communist Party-sponsored mass organizations.

Associate Editor
Shachno Epstein 1881-1945),(alleged to be an OGPU/NKVD agent -see Juliet Stuart Poyntz case)

Writers 
People who wrote for or served on the staff of Morgen Freiheit included:
Melech Epstein
Mike Gold
Moissaye Olgin
Yosl Cutler

Footnotes

Further reading

 Matthew Hoffman, "The Red Divide: The Conflict between Communists and their Opponents in the American Yiddish Press," American Jewish History, vol. 96, no. 1 (March 2010), pp. 1–31. In JSTOR

1922 establishments in the United States
1988 disestablishments in the United States
Defunct newspapers published in New York City
Jewish newspapers published in the United States
Socialist newspapers
Yiddish-language newspapers published in the United States
Newspapers established in 1922
Publications disestablished in 1988
Yiddish communist newspapers
Communist Party USA publications
Non-English-language newspapers published in New York (state)
Yiddish culture in New York City
Defunct Yiddish-language newspapers published in the United States
Daily newspapers published in New York City